Marcin Kaczmarek (born 3 December 1979 in Sieradz) is a Polish footballer playing currently for Star Starachowice.

Career

Club
In August 2008, he joined Lechia Gdańsk on a three-year contract.

In February 2011, he signed a contract with ŁKS Łódź.

On 8 June 2019, 39-year old Kaczmarek joined KSZO Ostrowiec Świętokrzyski.

National team
Marcin Kaczmarek also played twice in the Poland national football team. His debut took place in the game versus Iceland in Warsaw on 7 September 2005.

References

External links
 
 

1979 births
Living people
Polish footballers
Ceramika Opoczno players
KSZO Ostrowiec Świętokrzyski players
Korona Kielce players
Poland international footballers
Lechia Gdańsk players
ŁKS Łódź players
Widzew Łódź players
Olimpia Grudziądz players
Ekstraklasa players
I liga players
II liga players
III liga players
People from Sieradz
Sportspeople from Łódź Voivodeship
Association football midfielders